Switzerland competed at the 1964 Winter Olympics in Innsbruck, Austria.

None of the 72 athletes won a medal. It was the first and only time (as of Pyeongchang 2018) that Switzerland didn't win a single medal at Winter Olympics.

Alpine skiing

Men

Men's slalom

Women

Biathlon

Men

 1 Two minutes added per miss.

Bobsleigh

Cross-country skiing

Men

Men's 4 × 10 km relay

Figure skating

Men

Women

Pairs

Ice hockey

First round
Winners (in bold) qualified for the Group A to play for 1st-8th places. Teams, which lost their qualification matches, played in Group B for 9th-16th places.

|}

Medal round 
First place team wins gold, second silver and third bronze.

Canada 8-0 Switzerland
Finland 4-0 Switzerland
USSR 15-0 Switzerland
Czechoslovakia 5-1 Switzerland
Sweden 12-0 Switzerland
Germany (UTG) 6-5 Switzerland
USA 7-3 Switzerland

Luge

Men

(Men's) Doubles

Women

Nordic combined 

Events:
 normal hill ski jumping 
 15 km cross-country skiing

Ski jumping

Speed skating

Men

References
Official Olympic Reports
International Olympic Committee results database
 Olympic Winter Games 1964, full results by sports-reference.com

Nations at the 1964 Winter Olympics
1964
1964 in Swiss sport